At the 2011 Census of India, the population of the state of Tamil Nadu was 72,147,039, increasing from 62.4 million in 2001. There were 36,137,975 males and 36,009,064 females, with a sex ratio of 996 females per 1000 males. Its literacy rate was 80.09%. 10.51% of the population was below seven years old, and it had a population density of 555.

Distribution of population
The following table shows the distributions of male and female populations of Tamil Nadu's districts, as of 2011:

Important facts

Growth rate
As of 2011, Tamil Nadu's growth rate was 15.61%.

It performed reasonably well in literacy growth from 2001 to 2011, increasing from  73.47% to 80.09%. It came second in the CBSE pass percentage at 92.3%, after Trivandrum Region.

Religion demographics 
The following tables show the distribution of religious followers in Tamil Nadu, by number and percentage.

Workforce
At the 2001 census, Tamil Nadu had 27,878,282 workers (44.67% of its population) and 34,527,397 non-workers (55.33%).

See also
Ethnic groups of Tamil Nadu
Tamil people

References and notes

Caste Demographics :
44) http://infoelections.com/infoelection/index.php/tn/7434-caste-religion-wise-population-in-tamil-nadu.html

Tamil Nadu
Tamil Nadu